Michael Tinsley (born April 21, 1984 in Little Rock, Arkansas) is an American track and field athlete specializing in the 400 metres hurdles.

Early life
Tinsley, a native of Little Rock, Arkansas, was born on April 21, 1984. He attended Little Rock's Joe T. Robinson High School and Jackson State University.

Career
Tinsley achieved a personal best in the 400-meter hurdles in 2007 with a time of 48.02 seconds. He placed third at the 2010 USA Outdoor Track and Field Championships with a time of 48.46 seconds. He won the 400-meter hurdles event at the 2012 US Olympic Trials with a time of 48.33 seconds and earned a spot on the US Olympic team.

Tinsley won his first heat in the 400-meter hurdles at the Olympics in 49.13 seconds. He then won his semifinal in a season best time of 48.13 seconds. On August 6, 2012 Tinsley won silver at the 2012 London Olympics in the 400 meters hurdles, in a new personal best time of 47.91.  In 2013, Tinsley followed up his silver medal at the London Olympics with a silver medal at the 2013 World Championships in Moscow.

Personal life
Michael Tinsley has two sons MyKayle and Titus Tinsley.

References

External links
 

1984 births
American male hurdlers
Sportspeople from Little Rock, Arkansas
Track and field athletes from Arkansas
Joe T. Robinson High School alumni
Living people
Athletes (track and field) at the 2012 Summer Olympics
Athletes (track and field) at the 2016 Summer Olympics
Olympic silver medalists for the United States in track and field
Medalists at the 2012 Summer Olympics
World Athletics Championships athletes for the United States
Diamond League winners
USA Outdoor Track and Field Championships winners